Emperor Zhaowu may refer to:

Posthumous name
Liu Cong (Han Zhao) (died 318), emperor of Han Zhao
Murong Sheng (373–401), emperor of Later Yan
Shi Siming (703–761), emperor of Yan
Zhao Hongyin (899–956), father of Emperor Taizu and Emperor Taizong of Song

Era name
Wu Sangui (1678–1678), emperor of Zhou